LT24 Radio San Nicolás is a radio station on 1430 AM in San Nicolás de los Arroyos, Argentina.

History
In 1963, Radio San Nicolás began broadcasting as a closed circuit station to some 6,000 households in the town center of San Nicolás de los Arroyos, the first such station in Argentina. After frequencies were put out for bid on the AM band, Radio San Nicolás became an AM station and began broadcasting on October 10, 1969, making it one of the oldest stations in regional Argentina.

In 2013, control of Radio San Nicolás and its sister station on 88.3 FM changed hands.

References

Radio stations in Argentina
1969 establishments in Argentina
Radio stations established in 1969